Photo-identification is a technique used to identify and track individuals of a wild animal study population over time. It relies on capturing photographs of distinctive characteristics such as skin or pelage patterns or scars from the animal. In cetaceans, the dorsal fin area and tail flukes are commonly used.

Photo-identification is generally used as an alternative to other, invasive methods of tagging that require attaching a device to each individual. The technique enables precise counting, rather than rough estimation, of the number of animals in a population. It also allows researchers to perform longitudinal studies of individuals over many years, yielding data about the lifecycle, lifespan, migration patterns, and social relationships of the animals.

Species that are studied using photo-identification techniques include:
Killer whales
Humpback whales
Whale sharks
Manta rays - see Manta Matcher
Octopuses (Wunderpus photogenicus)
Salamanders
Giraffes

Killer whales
Here are links to killer whales photo-identification databases:
Killer whales of southern Alaska
Russian Orcas

Icelandic Orca Project

Norwegian Orca ID Catalogue

See also
 Michael Bigg, who pioneered the photo-identification of killer whales

References

Zoology
Animal identification
Applications of computer vision